Anderson Bigode Herzer (10 June 1962 in Rolândia, Paraná, Brazil – 10 August 1982, in São Paulo, São Paulo, Brazil) was a writer and poet. He committed suicide at the age of 20. The film Vera by Sérgio Toledo is based on Herzer's life.

Life and times 

Herzer was a transsexual man, ex-intern of FEBEM or Fundação Estadual para o Bem Estar do Menor (a State institution for the protection of minors) whose life and verses were published in a book titled A queda para o alto, translated as 'descending upwards' in English as This book; in turn, served as the basis for the Brazilian film production Vera, directed by Sérgio Toledo Segall (better known as Sérgio Toledo). He was four years old when his father was killed, and his mother, a prostitute at that time, felt unable to take care of him, therefore turning young Herzer in to FEBEM. Sometime soon after that, his mother died.

Although Herzer considered himself to be a lesbian for some time in his life, he then identified as transsexual. His school records show that he was a problem student, often engaging in fights, using street drugs and consuming alcohol.

Herzer was institutionalized in FEBEM when he was fourteen years old. At that time he adopted the name Anderson Bigode Herzer (Anderson being a common male first name in Brazil; although bigode is an unusual nickname, meaning mustache). He remained under the State's tutelage until seventeen years of age. At that time Eduardo Suplicy, a renowned member of parliament (deputado in Portuguese), touched by his poems and difficult life, acted as his protégé and hired him as an intern in his office.

Death
In spite of the support received, Herzer felt profoundly traumatized and decided to commit suicide by jumping off the Viaduto 23 de Maio, a viaduct located in the downtown area of São Paulo.

See also

 Rosely Roth

References 

1962 births
1982 suicides
20th-century Brazilian poets
Brazilian male poets
Transgender men
Transgender poets
Brazilian LGBT poets
Brazilian people of German descent
People from Rolândia
Suicides by jumping in Brazil
20th-century Brazilian male writers
LGBT-related suicides
20th-century Brazilian LGBT people